Tony Horton may refer to:
 Tony Horton (baseball), Major League baseball player
 Tony Horton (personal trainer), developer of the P90X workout system
 Tony Horton (rugby union), England international rugby union footballer